W. W. Scott may refer to:

William Winfield Scott (1855–1935), historian and lawyer
Winfield W. Scott III, Major General